Franssen is a Dutch patronymic surname meaning "son of Frans". It can refer to:

 Everhardt Franßen (born 1937), German judge
 Jan Franssen (born 1951), Dutch politician
 Jo Franssen (1909-1995), Dutch politician
 M.H.H. Franssen (1903-1981), Dutch lawyer
 Margot Franssen (born 1952), Dutch-born Canadian philanthropist, activist and entrepreneur
 Nico Valentinus Franssen (1932–1993), Dutch-born American physicist and inventor
 Franssen effect, an auditory illusion discovered by him
Franssens
Joep Franssens (born 1955), Dutch composer

See also
Fransen, Dutch surname

Dutch-language surnames
Patronymic surnames
Surnames from given names